XHEX-FM is a radio station on 88.7 FM in Culiacán, Sinaloa, Mexico. It is owned by Radio Fórmula and carries its news and talk programming.

History
XEEX-AM received its concession on May 2, 1963. It was owned by Martín Larios León and operated with 250 watts on 1400 kHz from facilities in El Dorado. By the 1980s, XEEX had moved to Culiacán proper and ramped up power to 1,000 watts. It was sold to Radio XEEX in 1993—during which time it moved to 1230 kHz—and to Fórmula in 2000.

References

Radio stations in Sinaloa